Pimelea gilgiana is a species of flowering plant in the family Thymelaeaceae and is endemic to near-coastal areas of north-western Western Australia. It is a shrub with narrowly egg-shaped leaves and head-like clusters of white or pinkish, dioecious flowers.

Description
Flowering occurs from June to September.

Taxonomy
Pimelea gilgiana was first formally described in 1904 by Ernst Georg Pritzel in Botanische Jahrbücher für Systematik, Pflanzengeschichte und Pflanzengeographie from specimens he collected near Champion Bay. The specific epithet (gilgiana) honours Ernest Friedrich Gilg.

Distribution and habitat
This pimelea grows in sand pockets and rock crevices on coastal limestone outcrops in near-coastal areas south from Dirk Hartog Island to near Leeman in the Carnarvon, Geraldton Sandplains, Swan Coastal Plain and Yalgoo bioregions of Western Australia.

Conservation status
Pimelea gilgiana is listed as "not threatened" by the Government of Western Australia Department of Biodiversity, Conservation and Attractions.

References

Malvales of Australia
gilgiana
Flora of Western Australia
Taxa named by Ernst Pritzel
Plants described in 1904